Cham Hendi (also Romanized as Cham Hendī and Cham-e Hendī; also known as Cham-e Hend) is a village in Abu Ghoveyr Rural District, Musian District, Dehloran County, Ilam Province, Iran. At the 2006 census, its population was 142, in 17 families.

References 

Populated places in Dehloran County